PP-93 Chiniot-I is a Constituency of Provincial Assembly of Punjab.

General elections 2013

General elections 2008

Election 2018 

General elections are scheduled to be held on 25 July 2018.

See also
 PP-92 Bhakkar-IV
 PP-94 Chiniot-II

References

External links
 Election commission Pakistan's official website
 Awazoday.com check result
 Official Website of Government of Punjab

Constituencies of Punjab, Pakistan